Notiphila aenea is a species of fly in the family Ephydridae. It is found in the  Palearctic .

References

External links
Images representing Notiphila  at BOLD

Ephydridae
Insects described in 1837
Taxa named by Joseph Waltl
Diptera of Europe